Yenebey-Ursayevo (Yänäbi-Ursay) is a rural locality (a selo) and the administrative centre of Yenebey-Ursayevsky Selsoviet, Miyakinsky District, Bashkortostan, Russia. The population was 285 as of 2010. There are 9 streets.

Geography 
Yenebey-Ursayevo is located 28 km west of Kirgiz-Miyaki (the district's administrative centre) by road. Bogdanovo is the nearest rural locality.

References 

Rural localities in Miyakinsky District